Yoon Bo-hyun is a South Korean physician and scientist in the medical area of obstetrics and gynecology. He researches in the area of preterm births, intra-amniotic infection or inflammation and fetal damage. For his theoretical and clinical academic achievements he received the Prize of the Korea Science & Technology Award in 2012.

Education
Yoon was born in Seoul, South Korea and grew up there. He graduated from the medical college of Seoul National University in 1979, where he received his M.D. and Ph.D. After a residency in the department of obstetrics and gynecology at the same college he joined the faculty there from 1988 until the present.

Work
Yoon's work focused on “intrauterine infection/inflammation, prematurity and fetal damage”, which is one of the most important challenges to medicine. Cerebral palsy is a serious motor disorder which frequently appears in preterm newborn babies, and has been traditionally linked to hypoxic obstetric events. However, many studies demonstrated a limited role for birth hypoxia in the etiology of cerebral palsy.

From 1996, Yoon and his colleagues provided strong clinical and experimental evidence that intrauterine infection/inflammation, which is causally linked to preterm birth, plays an important role in the pathogenesis of fetal brain damage and cerebral palsy. Moreover, they demonstrated that intrauterine infection/inflammation is an important risk factor for the development of bronchopulmonary dysplasia which is one of the most frequent and significant complications of preterm newborns. These have important implications because the two most important complications of preterm newborns, cerebral palsy and bronchopulmonary dysplasia, seem to be initiated before birth in some, and can be prevented and treated from in utero.

Over the last twenty years, Yoon and his colleagues have published a number of important articles in the area of preterm births, intra-amniotic infection/inflammation and fetal damage. His papers have been cited extensively in the literature, making his H-index 60 as of September 2014. He invented MMP-8 bedside test which identifies intra-amniotic infection/inflammation in patients at risk for preterm birth.

He and his co-workers have applied the results of his investigation to clinical fields. For example, The outcomes of preterm neonates who were born in Seoul National University Hospital have been improved noticeably since they actively diagnosed and treated intrauterine infection with new regimen of antibiotics they developed.

Awards 
For his scientific achievement Yoon received the First Paper Prize Award of the Society for Maternal-Fetal Medicine (1993), the Gwanghye Prize from Korean Medical Association (1994), the Certificate of the Prize for Outstanding Thesis from the Korean Federation of
Science and Technology Societies (1995), the Best Paper Award from the Korean Society for Obstetrics and Gynecology (1995), and the Award for Research Excellence of the International Society for Perinatal Obstetricians (1996).

He also achieved the Awards for Research Excellence of the Society for Maternal-Fetal Medicine (1999), the Best Researcher Award from the Seoul National University Hospital (1999), Namyang Academic Award from the Korean Society of Perinatology (2009), Bumsuk Prize from Bumsuk Academic Scholarship Foundation (2012), and the Prize of the Korea Science & Technology Award (2012).

See also
 Cerebral palsy
 Premature birth
 Periventricular leukomalacia

Further reading

South Korean obstetricians and gynaecologists
Academic staff of Seoul National University
Seoul National University alumni
Living people
20th-century South Korean physicians
21st-century South Korean physicians
Year of birth missing (living people)